Andrea Riccio (1532) was an Italian sculptor and occasional architect, whose real name was Andrea Briosco, but is usually known by his sobriquet meaning "curly"; he is also known as Il Riccio and Andrea Crispus ("curly" in Latin).  He is mainly known for small bronzes, often practical objects such as inkwells, door knockers or fire-dogs, exquisitely sculpted and decorated in a classicising Renaissance style.

He was born at Padua, and first trained as a goldsmith by his father, Ambrogio di Cristoforo Briosco.  He later began to study bronze casting under Bartolomeo Bellano, a pupil of Donatello.   As an architect, he is known for the church of Santa Giustina in his native city.  His masterpieces are the bronze Paschal candelabrum in the choir in Basilica of Sant'Antonio at Padua (1515), and the two bronze reliefs (1507) of David dancing before the Ark and Judith and Holofernes in the same church.  His bronze and marble tomb of the physician Girolamo della Torre in the church of San Fermo at Verona was beautifully decorated with reliefs, which were taken away by the French and are now in the Louvre.  His smaller, easily transportable, works appealed to collectors across Europe. A bronze lamp made by Riccio was a longtime possession of the Rothschild family, and is now in the collection of the Metropolitan Museum of Art.

References

External links

Six works from the Frick
Satyr in the Metropolitan
Biography of the Artist and link to works attributed in the collection, National Gallery of Art, Washington, DC
6 works from the Courtauld Institute photo collection

Italian Renaissance sculptors
Italian Renaissance architects
1470s births
1532 deaths
Architects from Padua
16th-century Italian architects
16th-century Italian sculptors
Italian male sculptors
Artists from Padua